Robert Alda (born Alfonso Giuseppe Giovanni Roberto D'Abruzzo; February 26, 1914 – May 3, 1986) was an Italian-American theatrical and film actor, a singer, and a dancer. He was the father of actors Alan and Antony Alda. Alda was featured in a number of Broadway productions, then moved to Italy during the early 1960s. He appeared in many European films over the next two decades, occasionally returning to the U.S. for film appearances such as The Girl Who Knew Too Much (1969).

Early life
Alda, an American of Italian descent, was born Alfonso Giuseppe Giovanni Roberto D'Abruzzo in New York City, the son of Frances (née Tumillo) and Antonio D'Abruzzo, a barber born in Sant'Agata de' Goti, Benevento, Campania, Italy. (D'Abruzzo is a toponymic surname.) He graduated from Stuyvesant High School in New York in 1930.

Career
He began his performing career as a singer and dancer in vaudeville after winning a talent contest, and moved on to burlesque.

Alda is known for portraying George Gershwin in the biographical film Rhapsody in Blue (1945) as well as the talent agent in the Douglas Sirk classic Imitation of Life (1959). On Broadway, he originated the role of Sky Masterson in Guys and Dolls (1950), for which he won a Tony Award, and starred in What Makes Sammy Run? (1964). He was also the host of the DuMont TV version of the game show What's Your Bid? (May–June 1953).

Alda made two guest appearances with his son Alan on M*A*S*H, in the episodes "The Consultant" (January 1975) and "Lend a Hand" (February 1980). The latter episode also featured Antony Alda, his younger son by his second wife.

Alda appeared in an episode of The Feather and Father Gang in 1977.

Personal life
Alda's first wife, and mother of actor Alan Alda, Joan Browne, was a homemaker and former beauty pageant winner. They divorced in 1946. Alda was married to his second wife and mother of Antony, Flora Marino, an Italian actress whom he met in Rome, until his death.

Death
Alda died on May 3, 1986, aged 72, after a long illness following a stroke.
 He is buried in the Garden of Ascension lot 9101 Forest Lawn Cemetery, Glendale, California.

Theater credits
 Guys and Dolls (1950–1953)
 Harbor Lights (1956)
 Roger the Sixth (1957)
 Can-Can (1963)
 What Makes Sammy Run? (1964–1965)
 Riverwind (1966)
 My Daughter, Your Son (1969)
 The Front Page (1969–1970)
 Follies (1973)
 The Sunshine Boys (1974-1975)

Selected filmography

 Rhapsody in Blue (1945) as George Gershwin
 Cinderella Jones (1946) as Tommy Coles
 Cloak and Dagger (1946) as Pinkie
 The Beast with Five Fingers (1946) as Bruce Conrad
 The Man I Love (1947) as Nicky Toresca
 Nora Prentiss (1947) as Phil Dinardo, Cafe Owner
 Bungalow 13 (1948)
 April Showers (1948) as Billy Shay
 Homicide (1949) as Andy
 Hollywood Varieties (1950) as Master of Ceremonies
 Tarzan and the Slave Girl (1950) as Neil
 Mister Universe (1951) as Fingers Maroni
 Two Gals and a Guy (1951) as Deke Oliver
 Beautiful But Dangerous (1955) as Maestro Doria
 Assignment Abroad (1955) as Major Bill Morgan
 Imitation of Life (1959) as Allen Loomis
 The Millionaire (TV series) episode "The Julia Conrad Story" (1959) as Gilbert Patterson, with co-star Ellen Drew
 Un militare e mezzo (1960) as Roy Harrison
 Cleopatra's Daughter (1960) as Inuni—Pharaoh's Architect
 Revenge of the Barbarians (1960) as Ataulf
 The Devil's Hand (1961) as Rick Turner
 Force of Impulse (1961) as Warren Reese
 Toto and Peppino Divided in Berlin (1962) as the judge
 Musketeers of the Sea (1962) as Vice Governatore Gomez
 That Woman (1966) as Wally
 The Girl Who Knew Too Much (1969) as Kenneth Allardice
 Night Flight from Moscow (1973) as Polygraph interrogator
 M*A*S*H (1975–1980, TV series) as Dr Anthony Borelli
 Cagliostro (1975) as Pope Clement XIII
 The House of Exorcism (1975) as Father Michael
 Natale in casa d'appuntamento (1976)
 I Will, I Will... for Now (1976) as Dr Magnus
 Won Ton Ton, the Dog Who Saved Hollywood (1976) as Richard Entwhistle
 Bittersweet Love (1976) as Ben Peterson
 The Rip-Off (1978) as Captain Donati
 The Rockford Files (1978, TV series) as Cy Margulies
 Every Girl Should Have One (1978) as Adam Becker
 Spider-Man Strikes Back (1978) as Mr. White
 Supertrain (1979, TV series) as Dan Lewis
 Days of Our Lives (1981–82) as Stuart Whyland
 Amanda's (1983, TV series) as Mr Gordon (final appearance)

See also

References

External links

 
 
 
  

1914 births
1986 deaths
20th-century American male actors
American burlesque performers
American male film actors
American male stage actors
American male television actors
American people of Italian descent
Burials at Forest Lawn Memorial Park (Glendale)
Donaldson Award winners
Male actors from New York City
Stuyvesant High School alumni
Tony Award winners
Vaudeville performers
Warner Bros. contract players